Manzel may refer to:

Places
Pain Zoghal Manzel, a village in Chapakrud Rural District
Halaleh-ye Manzel, village in Shahid Modarres Rural District
Manzel Darreh, a village in Chahardangeh Rural District

Arts and entertainment
Al-Manzel Raqam 13 (Arabic: المنزل رقم 13, House No. 13), a 1952 Egyptian mystery/crime film
Manzel (band)

People
Dagmar Manzel (born 1958), German actress
Ludwig Manzel (1858–1936), German sculptor, painter and graphic artist